Gonnosfanadiga, Gonnos or Gonnos-Fanàdiga in Sardinian language, is a town and comune on the island of Sardinia, in the province of South Sardinia, Italy. It is located between Medio Campidano plain to the northeast and the Monte Linas massif to the southwest.

The economy is mostly based on agriculture (olives, olive oil, bread, sweets, pig meat) and animal husbandry. The territory is home to two giants' graves.

Geography

Its territory extends in similar proportions between the plain of Medio Campidano to the northeast, the hills around the town and the massif of Monte Linas to the southwest. It also includes a village in the territory of Guspini: Pardu Atzei.

The town is situated on the slopes of the mountains and is crossed by the Rio Piras, river with torrential character.

History

The area results to be inhabited since prehistoric times, studies date back to the early Neolithic attend certain, that occurred between the sixth and fourth millennium BC in the territory of the Terr'e Seddari, but can not be ruled earlier settlements resulting from the good position and wealth of resources.

There are also relevant evidence that include remains of the nuragic period, Nuraghes and giants' graves, one of which, that of S. Cosimo (brought to light by excavations in the early 1980s), is among the largest in Sardinia.

There is no certain claims of the Phoenician, but the area is both close to the sea, from which came the skilled sailors in the Middle East, both at Nabui (S. Maria Neapolis in the territory of Guspini) where they founded a colony, and other areas frequented by the Phoenicians certainly like Antas in the territory of Fluminimaggiore.

About two centuries before Christ, the Romans arrived in Sardinia and also the territory of Gonnosfanadiga is rich in witnesses ranging from numerous finds of coins, ornaments and weapons, to the identification of the remains of fortifications, encampments, graves and four cemeteries

Around the sixth century AD, coinciding with the arrival of the Byzantine in the island, began the work of evangelization of the Greek monks, as evidenced by the names of many places, and the remains of numerous places of worship, some of them almost totally disappeared, and one of which remains a fine example: the rural church of S. Severa.

In medieval times is demonstrated the existence of various villages in the territory of Gonnosfanadiga: Bidda Atzei (or Zei), Gonnos Fanadiga, Gonnos de Montangia, Aqua de Gonnos, as centers that paid tithes to the Church in the years between 1341 and 1359. The list is not complete, however, being still inhabited at that time the center of Serru. Gonnosfanadiga, or rather its territory, was part of the Judges of Arborea, including in the administrative area of Bonorzuli and in the district of the diocese of Terralba.

About the birth of today's town the news is a little uncertain. Certainly in the modern era it exists with this name as a municipality.

Under Spanish rule in Sardinia (1479-1650 approximately) there are documents that describe the life of the country, which in this period belonged to the Marquis of Quirra.

On 17 February 1943, during the Second World War, the country suffered a heavy bombardment by the Americans against the civilian population. The dramatic event, which has not been noted yet a due justification, with more than a hundred civilians were killed and dozens wounded, maimed and mutilated, left a strong impression on the imagination of gonnesi, a collective shock that continues to disturb the memory.

Monuments and places of interest

Civil architecture

Gradinata (flight of steps)

Public wells

The public wells are numerous, well today there are about 50 of them, but many more were in the past. They had a great importance for their primary purpose of water supply for the country and for the significant function as a meeting place of the people of the various districts. Still numerous roads and districts have the name derived from the well that was in the area. Today they have lost both of those functions, water resource and social gathering (although on warm summer evenings it is not uncommon to find groups of neighbors, seated talking and try refreshing), but still for Gonnesi are an important topographical frame of reference and historical memory, in addition to being a source of architectural and touristic interest .

Squares and monuments

Archaeological sites

Giants grave of San Cosimo

The tomb of St. Cosimo I, located in San Cosimo, is also known as Sa Grutta de Santu Giuanni. The megalithic construction is dated around 1500 BC. The area on which it stands the tomb is strongly characterized by the remains of nuragical settlements. During the archaeological excavations, carried out in 1981, were found numerous items including handmade pottery (bowls and jars) and, unique in the archaeological of Sardinia, a necklace made of glass paste and glass. Has also been documented frequentation in Roman times. The site is easily accessible from the main road that leads from Gonnosfanadiga to Arbus.

Giants grave of Sant'Anastasia

Religious architecture

 Church of s. Barbara
 Church of sacro cuore (sacred heart)
 Church of b.v.di Lourdes

Church of s. Severa

Situated on a hill a few hundred meters from the town, dating back to the early Christian period (fourth-fifth century). It stands on the site of an ancient Roman necropolis, it is therefore likely that the devotion to this saint goes back to those early inhabitants of the place. Has undergone successive restorations since 1797.

The monument is a building with a Latin cross plan, with vaulted into fights arches. The nave, is divided into three mirrors by two pilasters on which are set the arches of the vault, but originally times were extrados with double curve, as can be seen by looking at the side prospectuses and the back. The roof is wooden beams.

To the right and left of the main door are the hinges that held the barriers. Later the Greek monks built the vault.

Disappeared church

The church of s. Antonio Abate stood in the medieval village of Gonnos de Montanya, and was the first parochial in the country. It stood on the area of the church of s. Barbara, who replaced her in the role of the parish.

The original structure was a single nave with side chapels preserved today only with a ribbed cross vault on corbels.

In the area of Serru are still the ruins of the parish church dedicated to s.

There is also another church called s. Inside the apse are ashlars, and some side walls have undergone modification.

The church of s. Elijah very old, and already decaying in the 700, was active until 1903, collapsed on 13 April 1908.

In the area there were also other churches: s. Mary of Montserrat, s. Maria Itria, s. Elena, demolished in 1761 by order of General Pope, to prevent who took refuge evildoers. Other churches were those of s. John, s. Bartholomew, s. Luke, s. Anastasia, s. Simeon, s. Michele (of which the outer walls are still visible) and s. Domenico.

Natural areas

Park Perd'e Pibara

The park Perd'e Pibara is located south of Gonnosfanadiga, and for the most part is characterized by a thick and secular forest of oaks accompanied by a typical Mediterranean woodland: filirea, arbutus, cistus, heather.

Other areas of the park, those further south where the pedo-morphological are exacerbate, they see prevail cistus, the everlasting helichrysum, thyme, broom, there is also a large area of mixed reforestation: cork oak, hardwood, pine, oaks.

It is also an ideal environment for the proliferation of several species of mushrooms that make it a popular destination for fans of mycology.

Also the fauna is varied and numerous, boars, foxes, rabbits, goats, hedgehogs, weasels, different diurnal and nocturnal raptors, jays, partridges, small rodents, reptiles, and huge goldfish living in a large deep basin constantly fed by the abundance of spring water.

Inside the park is also a placement of an abandoned molybdenite mine, an interesting example of industrial archeology.

The park is easily accessible and equipped with several rest stops, benches and tables, and some of the mine buildings, now restored, are used for conferences, exhibitions, and events often take place within nature, hiking and sports.

Mining

At one time, probably from prehistoric times and until the 1970s, mining was one of the main occupations in this area. Industrial exploitation arrived in late 1800 and mid-1900, a technical and professional organization very advanced and very profitable for the entire community. Now the industry has been completely abandoned.

In the municipality of Gonnosfanadiga there are the following disused mines:
 Mine Fenugu Sibiri
 Mine Loss' and Pibera
 Mine S'Acqua Prunas - Genna S'Olioni
 Mine Salaponi

Culture

Events

Feast of Olives

The festival of olives, agribusiness and local crafts is the appointment better prepared by the citizens of Gonnosfanadiga (that is also part of National association of oil cities) to showcase the most typical productions of the country.

It takes place at the end of November, in the midst of olive oil year fell, and it involves big and small local producers, artisans and traders operating in the peasant sector.

It has become a regular destination, since the mid-80s, of numerous intransigent tourists of taste it is now also interested in history, tradition and nature, since to the festival are alongside initiatives that aim to facilitate the knowledge and enjoyment of heritage cultural and territory.

During the event you can attend both the production cycle of extra virgin olive oil to the mill as for exhibitions, environmental reconstructions and historical paths inherent Gonnosfanadiga and its activities.

Economy

The economy of Gonnosfanadiga is mainly based on agro-pastoral sector and the processing of agricultural products, animated by small businesses, often family-run.

His productions of excellence are the olive oil and table olive of the cultivar Black of Gonnos (always famous throughout the island and now also beyond its borders as a consequence of the very high quality that distinguishes them from industrial production ), the typical bread and craft confectionery, meat and sausages derived from the common herd of sheep and goats and pigs, honey, and a decent production, although a significant decrease compared to the past, high-quality fruit and vegetables.

Consequently, many gonnesi are dedicated also to trade of these products, in particular are several butchers and many activities that trade fruit and vegetables, milk and dairy products.

To recognize a limited flower production, forestry (cork and wood) and textiles.

Many of the residents are employed in the services and industries in the district, because in the country is almost nonexistent industry and underdeveloped the services, although recently there is a growing commitment to the tourism sector, which could make a significant aid to an economy that in general is struggling due to both the high food crisis, the now definitive closure of the mines, once a source of wealth in the country, and the almost definitive failure of the industrial center of Villacidro, where many peoples found employment as laborers or as small business industries.

Finally would deserve more attention crafts, which although widely practiced as a hobby does not pursue large commercial purposes. Among the various products we notice the working of wood and cork, of pottery, of traditional fabrics, but especially stands out the skill of master knife which for centuries operate in Gonnosfanadiga, whose art of knife often seen her jewelry exhibited and cited internationally.

See also

 National association of oil cities
 National association of bread cities
 History of mining in Sardinia

Cities and towns in Sardinia